Jeff(rey) or Geoff(rey) Chapman may refer to:

Jeff Chapman a.k.a. Ninjalicious (1973–2005), Canadian urban explorer and fountaineer
Jeff Chapman (politician) (born 1959), American state senator
Jeff Chapman (singer) (born 1969), American Gospel singer
Jeff Chapman (footballer) (born 1948), Australian rules footballer
Jeffrey Chapman (lawyer) (born 1958), American attorney
Geoffrey Chapman (1930–2010), publisher

See also
Jeffrey Bowyer-Chapman (born 1984), Canadian-American actor and fashion model